"Honeymoon" is a song by American singer and songwriter Lana Del Rey co-written by Rick Nowels. It was uploaded to her YouTube channel on July 14, 2015 and was released for purchase as the second promotional single on September 7, 2015 from her fourth studio album of the same name.

Composition
One reviewer described "Honeymoon" as a ballad that frames the concepts of the overall album: "The title track opens the album with a cello moan and high, creeping violins and then floats for nearly six minutes as Del Rey promises glorious, aimless freedom. But she sounds utterly alone. You suspect she’s singing to someone who’s long gone." The song features sparse instrumental arrangements from a piano, a violin, and cello.

Release history
Prior to the release, the lyrics to the song were released as part of a lyric book, which was available for purchase among the merchandise for The Endless Summer Tour. Del Rey then posted two snippets of the song on her Instagram accounts. The song was finally released in a lyric video, which was uploaded on her official YouTube channel on July 14, 2015. The song was released through digital download on September 7, 2015.

Music video
The music video for "Honeymoon" was directed and edited by Del Rey. When asked if she was going to release it, Del Rey expressed: "You haven’t seen the full video for Honeymoon because I didn’t put it out yet. I don’t know if I will because I made it myself." Del Rey didn't reveal the video because "Nothing really happened in it." It leaked on the internet in July 2016, surfacing on YouTube. The video, shot on VHS, features close-ups of Del Rey applying makeup in front of a vanity, and walking along a poolside and through a grassy lawn; interspersed is footage of a tiger.

Reception
"Honeymoon" received critical acclaim. NME called the track "cinematic" and "emotionally thrilling" before describing it as "perhaps her most heart-stopping ballad yet". The Verge described the song as "six minutes of meandering bliss" and praised the "sweeping strings and stuttering snares" that "float through the background of the song", but also identified that, "like much of Lana Del Rey's work, the core of its appeal is in her voice." TIME called the song "characteristically broody" and "cinematic", and suggested it "leans closer to the sounds of her breakthrough LP Born to Die than the material she cooked up with the Black Keys' Dan Auderbach". However, a reviewer for the Australian publication StereoNET disagreed, stating that the material sounded akin to that on Ultraviolence.

The Independent praised the song, calling it "melancholic and beautiful". Billboard said the song was "grander and more ambitious than anything the singer-songwriter has released thus far", describing it as "epic".

Charts

References

External links

2010s ballads
2015 songs
Blue-eyed soul songs
Interscope Records singles
Lana Del Rey songs
Polydor Records singles
Pop ballads
Songs written by Lana Del Rey
Songs written by Rick Nowels
Song recordings produced by Lana Del Rey
Songs about domestic violence
Soul ballads